Kabaddi events were held from 26 September 2022 to 1 October 2022 at Transtadia EKA Arena, Ahemdabad.

Medal table

Medal summary 

Men's Team:
Gold🥇 Uttar Pradesh 
Silver🥈 Maharashtra
Bronze🥉 Haryana 
Bronze🥉 Services

Women's Team:
Gold🥇 Himachal Pradesh 
Silver🥈 Maharashtra
Bronze🥉 Haryana
Bronze🥉 Tamil Nadu

References

2022 National Games of India
Kabaddi competitions in India
2022 in kabaddi